Marc Holland (born 1974) is a British civil servant and diplomat. From August 2014 until March 2018, Holland has served as the Administrator of Ascension.

Career
Holland was educated at Wadham College, a college of the University of Oxford. Holland joined the Foreign and Commonwealth Office in 2002. Holland served at the Permanent Representation of the United Kingdom to the European Union in Brussels and then the British Embassy in Berlin, working on EU and labour issues. Until 2014 he served as the Deputy Head of the Future of Europe Department in London. Prior to that Holland had worked Department of Trade and Industry and as a planning and information officer in the education department of the Croydon London Borough Council.

Appointment as Administrator
In 2014, Holland was appointed to replace Colin Wells as Administrator of Ascension, a part of Saint Helena, Ascension and Tristan da Cunha which is a British Overseas Territory. Holland stated on his appointment that "We are all thrilled to be coming to Ascension. We look forward to taking full part in the community and sharing with you the unique experience of living and working in such a fascinating place"

Personal life
Holland is married with five children.

References

Living people
1974 births
Administrators of Ascension Island
Alumni of Wadham College, Oxford
British civil servants
British diplomats